Zinda Dil is a 2003 Bollywood film directed by Mohan Baggad.It stars Abbas and Ashima Bhalla in lead roles. Om Puri, Sharad Kapoor, Gulshan Grover, Johnny Lever, Vivek Shauq and Avtar Gill play supporting roles. The music was done by Nadeem–Shravan.

Cast 
 Abbas
 Ashima Bhalla
 Om Puri
 Sharad Kapoor
 Gulshan Grover
 Johnny Lever
 Vivek Shauq
 Avtar Gill

Soundtrack
The lyrics are penned by Sameer and music by Nadeem-Shravan. All the songs were hit.
"Aage Aage Tum" - Alka Yagnik
"Ek Masoom Sa Chehra" - Alka Yagnik, Udit Narayan
"Ek Masosm Sa Chehra" - Udit Narayan
"Ikrar Ho Na Jaye" - Udit Narayan
"Ikrar Ho Na Jaye (female)" - Alka Yagnik
"Mera Saajan Aa Gaya" - Mohammed Aslam, Shreya Ghoshal
"Mera Saajan Aa Gaya (sad)" - Mohammed Aslam
"Meri Sapnon Ki Rani" - Sarika Kapoor, Shabbir Kumar

External links 
 

2003 films
2000s Hindi-language films
Films scored by Nadeem–Shravan